Keswick is a historic plantation house near Powhatan, in Chesterfield County and Powhatan County, Virginia, USA. It was built in the early-19th century, and is an "H"-shaped, two-story, gable-roofed, frame-with-weatherboard building. It is supported on brick foundations and has a brick exterior end chimney on each gable. Also on the property are a contributing well house, a smokehouse, the circular "slave quarters," a kitchen, a two-story brick house, a shed, and a laundry.

It was listed on the National Register of Historic Places in 1974.

History 
The builder and first owner of "Keswick" was Charles Clarke, who received a grant of 1,500 acres on the south bank of the James River in both Henrico and Goochland Counties (today Chesterfield and Powhatan Counties) sometime in the early eighteenth century. In the middle of the eighteenth century, Clarke married Marianne Salle (a member of one of the Huguenot families settled in Powhatan County). To house his new family, he built a residence known as the "Manor House." This house was small, as it only had two stories with two rooms on each floor. Charles Clarke died in the late eighteenth century and Keswick passed to his son, James, who at his death passed the property to his son John.

John Clarke built a new house that today is the main house at Keswick Plantation. It had an H-shape that paralleled Tuckahoe across the river.

References

External links
Keswick, State Route 711 vicinity, Huguenot, Powhatan County, VA: 2 photos at Historic American Buildings Survey
Keswick, Brick House (first), State Route 711 vicinity, Huguenot, Powhatan County, VA: 1 photo, 7 measured drawings, and 2 data pages at Historic American Buildings Survey
Keswick, Quarters, State Route 711 vicinity, Huguenot, Powhatan County, VA: 7 photos, 4 measured drawings, and 3 data pages at Historic American Buildings Survey
Keswick, Guest House, State Route 711 vicinity, Huguenot, Powhatan County, VA: 1 photo at Historic American Buildings Survey
Keswick, Kitchen, State Route 711 vicinity, Huguenot, Powhatan County, VA: 2 photos at Historic American Buildings Survey
Keswick, Smokehouse, State Route 711 vicinity, Huguenot, Powhatan County, VA: 1 photo at Historic American Buildings Survey
Keswick, Main House (second), State Route 711 vicinity, Huguenot, Powhatan County, VA: 5 photos at Historic American Buildings Survey

Plantation houses in Virginia
Houses on the National Register of Historic Places in Virginia
Houses in Chesterfield County, Virginia
Houses in Powhatan County, Virginia
National Register of Historic Places in Chesterfield County, Virginia
National Register of Historic Places in Powhatan County, Virginia
Historic American Buildings Survey in Virginia
Slave cabins and quarters in the United States